Milan Milutinović (Serbian Cyrillic: Милан Милутиновић; born April 20, 1983) is a former Serbian footballer.

Career
Milutinović signed a 2-year deal with PFC Lokomotiv Plovdiv after being released from FK Vojvodina in 2008.

Honours
Radnik Surdulica
 Serbian First League: 2014–15

External links
 Milan Milutinović at Srbijafudbal
 
 Milan Milutinović stats at utakmica.rs
  Profile at Loko Plovdiv official site

1983 births
Living people
Sportspeople from Šabac
Serbian footballers
Association football midfielders
FK Mačva Šabac players
FK Vojvodina players
FK Hajduk Kula players
FK Donji Srem players
FK Radnik Surdulica players
Serbian SuperLiga players
PFC Lokomotiv Plovdiv players
FK Leotar players
MFK Dolný Kubín players
First Professional Football League (Bulgaria) players
2. Liga (Slovakia) players
Serbian expatriate footballers
Expatriate footballers in Bulgaria
Serbian expatriate sportspeople in Bulgaria
Expatriate footballers in Slovakia
Serbian expatriate sportspeople in Slovakia